Pyotr Yevseevich Braiko (9 September 1919 – 7 April 2018) was a Soviet soldier during the Second World War who gained the status of Hero of the Soviet Union following the conflict.

He took part in seven raids by the guerrilla brigade of Sydir Kovpak. Though he did not achieve his dream of a career as a military pilot he graduated from the Moscow Border Communication College.  He entered action on June 22, 1941 as a Soviet border guard on the border with Romania and witnessed the tragic encirclement and routing of Soviet forces near Kiev. He would come to spend years deep behind enemy lines where he took guidance from Soviet guerrilla leaders in Ukraine including Sydir Kovpak, Semyon Rudnev and Pyotr Vershigora.

See also
Soviet Partisans

References

External links
Oral history

1919 births
2018 deaths
People from Chernihiv Oblast
Heroes of the Soviet Union
Soviet partisans in Ukraine
Ukrainian people of World War II
Recipients of the Order of Lenin
Recipients of the Order of the Red Banner
Recipients of the Medal "For Courage" (Russia)
Recipients of the Medal of Zhukov
Recipients of the Order of the Cross of Grunwald, 2nd class
Frunze Military Academy alumni
Maxim Gorky Literature Institute alumni
Recipient of the Meritorious Activist of Culture badge